In 1881, Dudley Marjoribanks, MP, was elevated to the peerage as Baron Tweedmouth.  Hubert Jerningham defeated Henry Trotter by a then record margin, despite attacks on Jerningham for supporting the right of atheist Charles Bradlaugh, who had won in Northampton at the 1880 general election, to sit in Parliament.

References

History of Berwick-upon-Tweed
By-elections to the Parliament of the United Kingdom in Northumberland constituencies
1881 elections in the United Kingdom
1881 in England
19th century in Northumberland